The 2015 Lima Challenger was a professional tennis tournament played on clay courts. It was the ninth edition of the tournament which was part of the 2015 ATP Challenger Tour. It took place in Lima, Peru between October 26 and November 1, 2015.

Singles main-draw entrants

Seeds

 1 Rankings are as of October 19, 2015.

Other entrants
The following players received wildcards into the singles main draw:
  Nicolás Álvarez
  Mauricio Echazú
  Emilio Gómez
  Juan Pablo Varillas

The following players received entry from the qualifying draw:
  Hugo Dellien
  Cristian Garín
  Michael Linzer
  Juan Ignacio Londero

Champions

Singles

 Gastão Elias def.  Andrej Martin 6–2, 7–6(7–4)

Doubles

 Andrej Martin /  Hans Podlipnik def.  Rogério Dutra Silva /  João Souza 6–3, 6–4

External links
Official Website

Lima Challenger
Lima Challenger
October 2015 sports events in South America
November 2015 sports events in South America
2015 in Peruvian sport